The following radio stations broadcast on FM frequency 91.9 MHz:

Argentina
 Alternativa in Plottier, Neuquén
 Bunker in Santa Clara del Mar, Buenos Aires
 Class in Sáenz Peña, Buenos Aires
 Cristo la Solucion in Alberdi, Buenos Aires
 del Centro in Chivilcoy, Buenos Aires
 Digital in Córdoba
 Directa in Resistencia, Chaco
 El Fortín in San Miguel de Tucumán, Tucumán
 Factory in Reconquista, Santa Fe
 Fantástico in Buenos Aires
 Fuego in Remedios de Escalada, Buenos Aires
 Impacto in Colón, Entre Ríos
 La Torre in Buenos Aires
 Mantra in Buenos Aires
 Metro Rosario in Rosario, Santa Fe
 Milenium in Villa Constitución, Santa Fe
 Oasis in Salliquelo, Buenos Aires
 Play24 in Río Grande, Tierra del Fuego
 Radio de noticias in Santa Fe de la Vera Cruz, Santa Fe
 Radio María in La Quiaca, Jujuy
 Radio María in Puerto Deseado, Santa Cruz
 Radio María in Jáchal, San Juan
 ROTECO in General Rodríguez, Buenos Aires
 Sarmiento in Bowen, Mendoza
 Viva in Comodoro Rivadavia, Chubut

Australia
 4SEE in Sunshine Coast, Queensland
 91.9 Fresh FM in Gladstone, Queensland
 5ADL in Adelaide, South Australia
 3BDG in Bendigo, Victoria
 MTM FM in Coonamble, NSW

Canada (Channel 220)
 CBCC-FM in Hearst, Ontario
 CBEW-FM-1 in Leamington, Ontario
 CBF-FM-9 in Mont-Laurier, Quebec
 CBJ-FM-1 in Chibougamau, Quebec
 CBKF-FM-4 in Bellegarde, Saskatchewan
 CBNE-FM in Port aux Basques, Newfoundland and Labrador
 CBOB-FM in Brockville, Ontario
 CBON-FM-28 in Chapleau, Ontario
 CBUV-FM in Fort St. James, British Columbia
 CBYZ-FM in Vavenby, British Columbia
 CHIN-1-FM in Toronto, Ontario
 CHNV-FM-1 in Crawford Bay, British Columbia
 CIDE-FM in Sioux Lookout, Ontario
 CIDE-FM-1 in Bearskin Lake, Ontario
 CIDE-FM-2 in Big Trout Lake, Ontario
 CIDE-FM-3 in Cat Lake, Ontario
 CIDE-FM-4 in Deer Lake, Ontario
 CIDE-FM-5 in Fort Severn, Ontario
 CIDE-FM-6 in Kasabonika, Ontario
 CIDE-FM-7 in Kingfisher Lake, Ontario
 CIDE-FM-8 in Lac Seul/Kejick Bay, Ontario
 CIDE-FM-9 in Muskrat Dam, Ontario
 CIDE-FM-10 in North Spirit Lake, Ontario
 CIDE-FM-11 in Osnaburgh, Ontario
 CIDE-FM-12 in Pikangikum, Ontario
 CIDE-FM-13 in Poplar Hill, Ontario
 CIDE-FM-14 in Sachigo Lake, Ontario
 CIDE-FM-15 in Sandy Lake, Ontario
 CIDE-FM-16 in Slate Falls, Ontario
 CIDE-FM-17 in Wapekeka, Ontario
 CIDE-FM-18 in Weagamow Lake, Ontario
 CIDE-FM-19 in Wunnummin Lake, Ontario
 CIDE-FM-20 in Webequie First Nation, Ontario
 CIDE-FM-21 in Keewaywin First Nation, Ontario
 CJEC-FM in Quebec City, Quebec
 CJLR-FM-2 in Denare Beach/Creighton, Saskatchewan
 CKLX-FM in Montreal, Quebec
 CKLY-FM in Lindsay, Ontario
 CKNI-FM in Moncton, New Brunswick
 CKVI-FM in Kingston, Ontario
 VF2040 in Wollaston Lake, Saskatchewan
 VF2200 in Winfield, British Columbia
 VF2588 in Swift Current, Saskatchewan

China 

 Beijing Public Service Radio in Beijing

India

 91.9 Sarthak FM in Bhubaneswar & Rourkela, Odisha, India
 91.9 Radio Mango in Cochin, India.
 Indigo 91.9 FM in Bangalore (Karnataka) and Goa, India
 Radio City (alternative frequency) in Agra (UP), Bareilly (UP), Varanasi (UP), Gorakhpur (UP), Hisar (HR), Karnal (HR), Madurai (TN), Ranchi (JH), Udaipur (RJ) and Jalandhar (PB)

Japan
 JOUF in Osaka

Korea, Republic of
 HLKV-FM in Seoul

Malaysia
 Ai FM in Kota Kinabalu, Sabah
 Red FM in Kuching, Sarawak

Mexico
 XHBL-FM in Culiacán, Sinaloa
 XHEC-FM in Sabinas, Coahuila
 XHESP-FM in Guadalajara, Jalisco
 XHHPL-FM in Huajuapan de León, Oaxaca
 XHJJM-FM in Jojutla, Morelos
 XHMET-FM in Temozon, Yucatán
 XHPHOP-FM in Hopelchén, Campeche
 XHRLM-FM in Ciudad Mante, Tamulipas
 XHSCBP-FM in Ciudad Altamirano, Guerrero
 XHSCBY-FM in Jacala de Ledezma, Hidalgo
 XHSCEF-FM in Santa Clara del Cobre, Salvador Escalante, Michoacán
 XHSS-FM in San Luis Potosí, San Luis Potosí
 XHUASM-FM in Matehuala, San Luis Potosí
 XHVJL-FM in Puerto Vallarta, Jalisco
 XHYA-FM in Irapuato, Guanajuato

Philippines
 91.9 The Bomb FM in Cavite City, Cavite
DWBL-FM in San Fernando, Pampanga
DWCH in Batangas City
DYKS-FM in Bacolod City
DXEC in Cagayan De Oro City
DZYS in Baguio City
DWLV-FM in Naga City
DXCK in General Santos City

United States (Channel 220)
 KAEB in Sand Point, Alaska
 KALD in Caldwell, Texas
 KANR in Santa Rosa, New Mexico
  in Kilauea, Hawaii
  in Jonesboro, Arkansas
  in Lufkin, Texas
 KAXV in Bastrop, Louisiana
 KBCW-FM in McAlester, Oklahoma
 KBDD in Winfield, Kansas
  in Willmar, Minnesota
  in Barrow, Alaska
 KBUQ in Buckland, Alaska
 KBWE in Burley, Idaho
  in Pueblo, Colorado
 KCKF in Cuba, Missouri
  in Church Point, Louisiana
 KCKV in Kirksville, Missouri
  in Chadron, Nebraska
  in Santa Barbara, California
 KCSS (FM) in Turlock, California
  in Kenai, Alaska
  in Yakima, Washington
  in Crete, Nebraska
 KDPO in Port Orford, Oregon
 KDRG in Deering, Alaska
 KDSU in Fargo, North Dakota
 KDUR in Durango, Colorado
 KELC in Hawthorne, Nevada
 KESY (FM) in Baker City, Oregon
 KEYP in Price, Utah
  in Great Falls, Montana
  in Bozeman, Montana
 KGNR in John Day, Oregon
 KHCJ in Jefferson, Texas
 KHEB in Granite, Oklahoma
  in Laytonville, California
 KHLR in Harrison, Arkansas
  in Port o'Connor, Texas
 KHSR in Crescent City, California
  in North Nenana, Alaska
 KIAN in Kiana, Alaska
 KIEA in Selawik, Alaska
 KJGS in Aurora, Nebraska
 KJLG in Emporia, Kansas
 KJNR in Bethel, Alaska
 KJOL-FM in Montrose, Colorado
 KLDD in McCloud, California
  in Dripping Springs, Texas
  in Middletown, California
  in Gillette, Wyoming
  in Glenwood Springs, Colorado
 KMEO in Mertzon, Texas
 KMRL in Buras, Louisiana
  in Astoria, Oregon
 KNUN in Toksook Bay, Alaska
  in Sells, Arizona
 KOLD-FM in Cold Bay, Alaska
  in Dodge City, Kansas
 KORI in Noorvik, Alaska
 KOUA in Ada, Oklahoma
 KPBW in Brewster, Washington
  in Callisburg, Texas
 KPGA (FM) in Morton, Texas
 KPMA-FM in Archer City, Texas
 KPMD in Evanston, Wyoming
 KPSV-FM in Tulare, California
 KPTZ in Port Townsend, Washington
 KQNY in Quincy, California
 KQOH in Marshfield, Missouri
 KQPA-FM in Paris, Texas
  in Lowry, South Dakota
 KQVK in Kivalina, Alaska
  in Espanola, New Mexico
  in Las Vegas, New Mexico
 KRTY in Great Bend, Kansas
  in Eugene, Oregon
  in Agat, Guam
  in Manhattan, Kansas
  in Spokane, Washington
 KSOI in Murray, Iowa
 KSPB in Pebble Beach, California
  in Saint Joseph, Missouri
  in Durant, Oklahoma
 KTCC in Colby, Kansas
  in State Center, Iowa
 KTML in South Fork, Colorado
 KTOG in Togiak, Alaska
 KTRU in La Harpe, Kansas
  in Tok, Alaska
 KUFN in Hamilton, Montana
  in Saint Paul, Alaska
 KUUK in Noatak, Alaska
  in Laramie, Wyoming
 KVCR (FM) in San Bernardino, California
 KVIR in Dolan Springs, Arizona
  in Globe, Arizona
  in Liberty, Missouri
 KWQX in Perryville, Arkansas
  in Sun Valley, Idaho
 KWSC in Wayne, Nebraska
 KWSO in Warm Springs, Oregon
  in Ridgecrest, California
  in International Falls, Minnesota
 KXFR in Socorro, New Mexico
 KXRI in Amarillo, Texas
  in Russellville, Arkansas
 KYKT in Yakutat, Alaska
  in Yuma, Arizona
 KYUP in Scammon Bay, Alaska
 KZGC-FM in Garden City, Kansas
 KZNC in Red Dog Mine Port, Alaska
  in Forest City, Iowa
 KZRF-FM in Sulphur Springs, Texas
  in New Bern, North Carolina
  in Springfield, Massachusetts
  in Clarksville, Tennessee
 WARD in New Paris, Ohio
  in Waycross, Georgia
  in Duck Hill, Mississippi
 WAYL in Saint Augustine, Florida
  in Elkins, West Virginia
  in Worcester, Massachusetts
 WBRQ (FM) in La Grange, Georgia
 WCAL in California, Pennsylvania
  in Plattsburgh, New York
  in Williamstown, Massachusetts
 WCLK in Atlanta, Georgia
  in Putney, Vermont
 WDPW in Greenville, Michigan
 WDRT in Viroqua, Wisconsin
 WDSV in Greenville, Mississippi
 WEMI in Appleton, Wisconsin
 WEVQ in Littleton, New Hampshire
  in Falmouth, Massachusetts
 WFPK in Louisville, Kentucky
  in Fayetteville, North Carolina
  in Frostburg, Maryland
 WGBQ in Lynchburg, Tennessee
 WGCP in Cadillac, Michigan
  in Defiance, Ohio
  in Birmingham, Alabama
  in Takoma Park, Maryland
 WHDD-FM in Sharon, Connecticut
 WHDI in Sister Bay, Wisconsin
 WHGN in Crystal River, Florida
  in Proctorville, Ohio
  in Terre Haute, Indiana
 WHRE in Eastville, Virginia
 WHRT-FM in Cokesbury, South Carolina
 WHVM in Owego, New York
 WINH in Hinckley, Minnesota
 WINO in Watkins Glen, New York
 WITT (FM) in Zionsville, Indiana
  in Joliet, Illinois
  in Lafayette, Indiana
  in Opp, Alabama
  in Gambier, Ohio
 WKJA in Brunswick, Ohio
  in Monticello, Florida
 WKWJ in Key West, Florida
  in Wausau, Wisconsin
  in Port Wentworth, Georgia
  in Jacksonville, Alabama
  in Belpre, Ohio
  in Dixons Mills, Alabama
  in Orono, Maine
 WMJC in Richland, Michigan
 WMKL in Hammocks, Florida
 WMMH in Houtzdale, Pennsylvania
  in Houghton, Michigan
  in Fort Myers, Florida
 WNGN (FM) in Argyle, New York
  in Charlottesville, Virginia
  in Port Huron, Michigan
  in Chillicothe, Ohio
  in Burnsville, Mississippi
  in Northampton, Massachusetts
  in Wheeling, West Virginia
  in Howe, Indiana
 WRCM in Wingate, North Carolina
  in Utica, New York
  in Vero Beach, Florida
  in Lake Ronkonkoma, New York
 WSIU (FM) in Carbondale, Illinois
  in New Canaan, Connecticut
 WSMJ in North Wildwood, New Jersey
 WSMO in Mount Forest, Michigan
 WTIR in Brighton Reservation, Florida
 WUIS in Springfield, Illinois
  in Boston, Massachusetts
 WUOT in Knoxville, Tennessee
 WVGS in Statesboro, Georgia
  in Meadville, Pennsylvania
 WVSE in Christiansted, U.S. Virgin Islands
  in Huntington, Indiana
 WVTR in Marion, Virginia
 WWOS-FM in St. George, South Carolina
 WWRA in Clinton, Louisiana
 WXHM in Middletown, Delaware
 WXMF in Marion, Ohio
 WXPJ in Hackettstown, New Jersey
 WXPW in Wausau, Wisconsin
  in Lakeland, Florida
  in Harpswell, Maine
 WYTL in Wyomissing, Pennsylvania
 WZRG in Kulpmont, Pennsylvania

External links
Radio stations by frequency at Online Radio FM

Lists of radio stations by frequency